Boluband (also Romanized as Bolūband; also known as Būlband and Bulupund) is a village in Alvir Rural District, Kharqan District, Zarandieh County, Markazi Province, Iran. At the 2006 census, its population was 144, in 53 families.

References 

Populated places in Zarandieh County